Gerhard Wies is a paralympic athlete from Germany competing mainly in category F56 throwing events.

Gerhard competed in both the 2000 and 2004 Summer Paralympics on both occasions in the shot, discus and javelin.  His medal success came in the shot put, winning the bronze medal in 2000 and improving to silver in 2004.

References

Paralympic athletes of Germany
Athletes (track and field) at the 2000 Summer Paralympics
Athletes (track and field) at the 2004 Summer Paralympics
Paralympic silver medalists for Germany
Paralympic bronze medalists for Germany
Living people
Medalists at the 2000 Summer Paralympics
Medalists at the 2004 Summer Paralympics
Year of birth missing (living people)
Paralympic medalists in athletics (track and field)
German male shot putters
Wheelchair shot putters
Paralympic shot putters